Lukáš Diviš (born 20 February 1986) is a Slovak–Russian volleyball players, former member of the Slovakia and Russia men's national volleyball team.

Personal life
His brother, Peter, is also a volleyball player.

Career
He became a Russian citizen in 2014. His brother Peter (born 1978) also plays volleyball.

In 2016, Divish was chosen into the team Russia at the World League. He debuted for his team on 24 June, when his team played against France in Lodz.

Sporting achievements

Clubs
 CEV Champions League
  2006/2007 – with VfB Friedrichshafen
  2012/2013 – with Lokomotiv Novosibirsk

 National championships
 2006/2007  German Cup, with VfB Friedrichshafen
 2006/2007  German Championship, with VfB Friedrichshafen
 2007/2008  German Cup, with VfB Friedrichshafen
 2007/2008  German Championship, with VfB Friedrichshafen
 2008/2009  German Championship, with VfB Friedrichshafen
 2009/2010  Turkish Championship, with Fenerbahçe İstanbul
 2010/2011  Russian Cup, with Lokomotiv Novosibirsk

Individual awards
 2007: CEV Champions League – Best Receiver

References

External links
 
 Player profile at PlusLiga.pl 
 Player profile at Volleybox.net

1986 births
Living people
Sportspeople from Žilina
Naturalised citizens of Russia
Slovak men's volleyball players
Russian men's volleyball players
Slovak expatriate sportspeople in the Czech Republic
Expatriate volleyball players in the Czech Republic
Slovak expatriate sportspeople in Germany
Expatriate volleyball players in Germany
Slovak expatriate sportspeople in Turkey
Expatriate volleyball players in Turkey
Slovak expatriate sportspeople in Poland
Expatriate volleyball players in Poland
Fenerbahçe volleyballers
Jastrzębski Węgiel players
VC Zenit Saint Petersburg players
Galatasaray S.K. (men's volleyball) players
Outside hitters